Charles Lokolingoy (born 2 March 1997) is an Australian professional footballer who plays as a forward for Żebbuġ Rangers.

Early life
Lokolingoy was born in the Democratic Republic of the Congo, and moved to Australia at the age of 11.

Club career

Sutherland Sharks
Lokolingoy started his career at Sutherland Sharks, playing for them for two seasons before joining Sydney FC.

Sydney FC
In February 2017, Lokolingjoy was promoted by Sydney FC to the first team. He was released by Sydney FC on the transfer deadline day.

Brisbane Roar
A couple of weeks after his deadline day release from Sydney FC, Lokolingjoy joined Brisbane Roar for the remainder of the season, together with Ruon Tongyik. On 30 April 2019, it was announced that Lokolingjoy would not be continuing with Brisbane Roar, along with another 13 players.

Return to Sutherland Sharks
A week after his release by Brisbane Roar, Lokolingoy was signed by his former club Sutherland Sharks.

Pegasus
In August 2019, Lokolingoy signed for Hong Kong Premier League club Pegasus. He scored during his debut for the club. On 22 December 2019, Loklingoy left the club since he could not adapt to the climate of Hong Kong.

Sydney Olympic
In January 2020, Lokolingoy signed with Sydney Olympic for the season.

International career
In 2015, Lokolingoy was called up to represent the Australian under-23 team.

Honours

Club
Sydney FC
A-League Premiership: 2017–2018
FFA Cup: 2017

References

External links

NPL profile

1997 births
Living people
Footballers from Kinshasa
Australian soccer players
Democratic Republic of the Congo footballers
Democratic Republic of the Congo emigrants to Australia
Association football forwards
Sydney FC players
Brisbane Roar FC players
TSW Pegasus FC players
Sydney Olympic FC players
Wellington Phoenix FC players
A-League Men players
National Premier Leagues players
Hong Kong Premier League players
Australian expatriate soccer players
Australian expatriates in Hong Kong